Enquire and similar may mean:

 ENQUIRE, the predecessor of the World Wide Web
 EnQuire - Grants Project & Contract Management, a web based software application

See also
 enquiry, for the act of asking
 wikt:enquiry